American Guitar is an album by American guitarist Pat Donohue that was released in 2000.

Reception

Writing for Allmusic, critic Mark Vanderhoff wrote of the album "... a collection of his own compositions and American standards, played in his signature rootsy, jaw-dropping style. While Donohue's own pieces showcase his mastery of fingerpicked acoustic guitar... From start to finish, American Guitar offers top-notch performances that are impressive without being cerebral or sterile. Indeed, a sense of playfulness and fun are present throughout. What really sets Donohue apart from the pack is that he somehow conveys that he's enjoying himself as much as the listener."

Track listing 
All songs by Pat Donohue unless otherwise noted.
 "Novocaine" – 2:08
 "Welcome Home" – 3:03
 "Mudslide" – 3:04
 "Arkansas Traveler" (Traditional) – 2:45
 "Blue Tango" (Leroy Anderson, Mitchell Parish) – 3:28
 "Maple Leaf Rag" (Scott Joplin) – 3:06
 "Fall Creek" – 1:57
 "Freight Train" (Elizabeth Cotten) – 1:49
 "Into the Garden" – 2:40
 "Rush Hour" – 2:18
 "All Thumbs" – 2:29
 "Hard Times (Come Again No More)" (Stephen Foster) – 2:13
 "Joe Fingers" – 2:52
 "Millwood" – 2:08
 "Tears" (Frank Capano) – 2:42
 "The Star-Spangled Banner" (Francis Scott Key, John Stafford Smith) – 1:42

Personnel 
 Pat Donohue – guitar

Production notes 
 Sam Hudson – engineer
 Brian Forrester – mastering, engineer
 Mary Ellen LaMotte – photography
 Dean Olson – design

References 

2000 albums
Pat Donohue albums